Kenosha may refer to:

Events
Kenosha protests, aftermath of the shooting of Jacob Blake in 2020

Places in the United States

Colorado
Kenosha Pass, a high mountain route in the Rocky Mountains

Wisconsin
Kenosha, Wisconsin, a city on the southwestern shore of Lake Michigan
Kenosha County, Wisconsin, a jurisdiction in the southeastern corner of the state
Kenosha Sand Dunes, a feature on the northern tip of the Chiwaukee Prairie Natural Area

Organizations
Kenosha Comets, a women's professional baseball team that played from 1943 through 1951
Kenosha Kingfish, a collegiate summer baseball league
Kenosha Yacht Club, a chartered organization on the western shore of Lake Michigan

See also
USS Kenosha
Konosha, Russia

